Gordon Matthew Thomas Sumner  (born 2 October 1951), known as Sting, is an English musician and actor.

General Awards 
Sting and his wife Trudie received the Courage of Conscience Award for their commitment to the environment through the establishment of the Rainforest Foundation; to human rights in China through the documentary film on Tiananmen Square; and to peace and social justice through the powerful gift of song. In 2000, Sting had a star unveiled on the Hollywood Walk of Fame.

In the Queen's Birthday Honours 2003 Sting was appointed a Commander of The Most Excellent Order of the British Empire For services to the Music Industry.

In 2007, the French Government appointed Sting (along with Police bandmates Andy Summers and Stewart Copeland) a Chevalier of the Ordre des Arts et des Lettres.

Sting was honored by the Upright Citizens Brigade team, Fambly, in the form of a 30-minute sketch comedy show devoted to the 1999 song "Brand New Day".  He was formally invited to the encore performance of the show, held at the theatre on November 7, 2011, via the Twitter hashtag #StingUCB.

He received the Polar Music Prize in 2017.

In 2017, Sting received the Golden Plate Award of the American Academy of Achievement, presented by Awards Council member President Bill Clinton during the International Achievement Summit in London.

In 2019, Sting was the recipient of the Global Citizen Prize for Artist of the Year.

Academy Awards 

|-
| 2000
| "My Funny Friend and Me" (from The Emperor's New Groove)
| rowspan=4| Best Original Song
| 
|-
| 2001
| "Until..." (from Kate & Leopold)
| 
|-
| 2003
| "You Will Be My Ain True Love" (from Cold Mountain with Alison Krauss)
| 
|-
| 2016
| "The Empty Chair" (from Jim: The James Foley Story)
| 
|}

American Music Awards 

|-
| style="text-align:left;"|2016
| Himself 
| Award of Merit 
|

American Screenwriters Association 

|-
| style="text-align:left;"|2004
| Himself 
| David Angell Humanitarian Award
|

Annie Awards 

|-
| style="text-align:left;"|2001
| Perfect World 
| Outstanding Individual Achievement for a Song in an Animated Production 
|

BMI London Awards 

|-
| style="text-align:left;"|2016
| Himself 
| Icon Award 
|

Blockbuster Entertainment Awards 

|-
| style="text-align:left;"|2001
| Himself 
| Favorite Male Artist 
|
|-
| --
| Himself 
| Favorite Pop Artist 
|
|-
| --
| Himself 
| Favorite Rock Artist 
|

Brit Awards 

|-
| style="text-align:left;"|1988
| Nothing Like the Sun
| Best British Album 
|
|-
| style="text-align:left;"|1994
| Himself 
| British Male Solo Artist 
|
|-
| --
| Ten Summoner's Tales 
| MasterCard British Album
|
|-
| --
| Fields of Gold 
| Best British Video
|
|-
| style="text-align:left;"|1997
| Himself  
| Best British Male 
|
|-
| style="text-align:left;"|2000
| Himself  
| Best British Male 
|
|-
| style="text-align:left;"|2002
| Himself  
| Outstanding Contribution to Music
|

Broadcast Film Critics Association Awards 

|-
| style="text-align:left;"|2001
| My Funny Friend and Me
| Best Song 
|
|-
| style="text-align:left;"|2002
| Until 
| Best Song  
|

Billboard Music Awards

|-
| style="text-align:left;"|1993
| Himself
| Top Adult Contemporary Artist
|
|-
| style="text-align:left;"|2003
| Himself
| Century Award
|

CMT Music Awards 

|-
| style="text-align:left;"|2007
| Always on Your Side (feat. Sheryl Crow) 
| Country Video of the Year
|
|-
| style="text-align:left;"|2012
| If I Ever Lose My Faith in You (feat. Vince Gill) 
| CMT Performance of the Year
|

Classic Rock Roll of Honour Awards 

!Ref.
|-
| rowspan=2|2016
| Summer 2015 Tour
| Tour of the Year
| 
| rowspan=2|
|-
| 57th & 9th
| Album of the Year
| 
|-
| 2017
| Live at the Olympia Paris
| Best New Live Album or Video 
| 
|

Denmark GAFFA Awards 

!Ref.
|-
| style="text-align:left;"|1994
| Himself
| Best Foreign Solo Act
| 
|

Golden Globe Awards 

|-
| style="text-align:left;"|1999
| The Mighty  
| Best Original Song 
|
|-
| style="text-align:left;"|2001
| My Funny Friend and Me 
| Best Original Song
|
|-
| style="text-align:left;"|2002
| Until  
| Best Original Song 
|
|-
| style="text-align:left;"|2004
| You Will Be My Ain True Love 
| Best Original Song
|

Grammy Awards 

|-
| align="center"| 
| "Reggatta de Blanc"
| rowspan="2"| Best Rock Instrumental Performance
| 
|-
| align="center" rowspan="2"| 
| "Behind My Camel"
| 
|-
| "Don't Stand So Close to Me"
| Best Rock Performance by a Duo or Group with Vocal
| 
|-
| align="center" rowspan="6"| 
| Synchronicity
| Album of the Year
| 
|-
|rowspan="3"| "Every Breath You Take"
| Song of the Year
| 
|-
| Record of the Year
| 
|-
| Best Pop Performance by a Duo or Group with Vocal
| 
|-
| "Synchronicity II"
| Best Rock Performance by a Duo or Group with Vocal
| 
|-
| "Brimstone and Treacle"
| Best Rock Instrumental Performance
| 
|-
| align="center" rowspan="5"| 
|rowspan="4"| The Dream of the Blue Turtles
| Best Engineered Recording
| 
|-
| Best Jazz Instrumental Performance
| 
|-
| Album of the Year
| 
|-
| Best Male Pop Vocal Performance
| 
|-
| "Money for Nothing"
| Song of the Year
| 
|-
| align="center"| 
| Bring On the Night
| Best Music Video, Long Form
| 
|-
| align="center"| 
| Bring on the Night
| Best Male Pop Vocal Performance
| 
|-
| align="center" rowspan="3"| 
|rowspan="2"| "Be Still My Beating Heart"
| Song of the Year
| 
|-
| Best Male Pop Vocal Performance
| 
|-
| ...Nothing Like the Sun
| Album of the Year
| 
|-
| align="center"| 
| "The Soul Cages"
| Best Rock Song
| 
|-
| align="center" rowspan="7"| 
|rowspan="3"| "If I Ever Lose My Faith in You"
| Song of the Year
| 
|-
| Record of the Year
|  
|-
| Best Male Pop Vocal Performance
| 
|-
|rowspan="3"| Ten Summoner's Tales
| Album of the Year
| 
|-
| Best Music Video, Long Form
| 
|-
| Best Engineered Album, Non-Classical
| 
|-
| Demolition Man
| Best Rock Solo Vocal Performance
| 
|-
| align="center" rowspan="1"| 
| "All For Love" (with Bryan Adams & Rod Stewart)
| Best Pop Collaboration with Vocals
| 
|-
| align="center"| 
| "When We Dance"
| Best Male Pop Vocal Performance
| 
|-
| align="center" rowspan="2"| 
| Mercury Falling
| Best Pop Vocal Album
| 
|-
| "Let Your Soul Be Your Pilot"
| Best Male Pop Vocal Performance
| 
|-
| align="center"| 
| "I'm So Happy I Can't Stop Crying" (with Toby Keith)
| Best Country Collaboration with Vocals 
| 
|-
| align="center"| 
| "You Were Meant for Me"
| Best Male Pop Vocal Performance
| 
|-
| align="center" rowspan="2"| 
|rowspan="2"| Brand New Day
| Best Male Pop Vocal Performance
| 
|-
| Best Pop Vocal Album || 
|-
| align="center"| 
| "She Walks This Earth (Soberana Rosa)"
| Best Male Pop Vocal Performance
| 
|-
| align="center"| 
| "Fragile (Live)"
| Best Male Pop Vocal Performance
| 
|-
| align="center" rowspan="2"| 
| "Whenever I Say Your Name" (with Mary J. Blige)
| Best Pop Collaboration with Vocals
| 
|-
| "Send Your Love"
| Best Male Pop Vocal Performance
| 
|-
| align="center"| 
| "You Will Be My Ain True Love" (with Alison Krauss)
| Best Song Written for a Motion Picture, Television or Other Visual Media
| 
|-
| style="text-align:left;"|2007
| Always on Your Side (feat. Sheryl Crow)
| Best Pop Collaboration with Vocals
|
|-
| style="text-align:left;"|2019
| 44/876 (with Shaggy)
| Best Reggae Album
|

Hungarian Music Awards 

|-
| 1995
| Fields of Gold: The Best of Sting 1984–1994
| rowspan=4|Best Foreign Album
| 
|-
| 2001
| Brand New Day
| 
|-
| 2002
| All This Time
| 
|-
| 2004
| Sacred Love
| 
|-
| 2012
| Symphonicities
|rowspan=3|Pop-Rock Album of the Year 
| 
|-
| 2014
| The Last Ship
| 
|-
| 2017
| 57th & 9th
|

Ivor Novello Awards 

|-
| align="center" rowspan="2"|1982
|rowspan="2"| Every Little Thing She Does Is Magic
| The Best Pop Song 
| 
|-
| International Hit of the Year
| 
|-
| align="center" rowspan="4"|1984
|rowspan="4"| Every Breath You Take
| The Best Rock Song 
| 
|-
| International Hit of the Year
| 
|-
| The Best Song Musically And Lyrically
| 
|- 
| Most Performed Work
| 
|-
| style="text-align:left;"|1986
| Money For Nothing
| Best Contemporary Song
|
|-
| style="text-align:left;"|1989
| They Dance Alone 
| The Best Song Musically And Lyrically 
|
|-
| style="text-align:left;"|1994
| If I Ever Lose My Faith in You 
| The Best Song Musically And Lyrically 
|
|-
| align="center" rowspan="3"|1998
|rowspan="3"| I'll Be Missing You
| Most Performed Work
| 
|-
| International Hit of the Year
| 
|-
| Best Selling UK Single 
| 
|-
| style="text-align:left;"|2002
| Himself  
| International Achievement
|

Kennedy Center Honors

Las Vegas Film Critics Society Awards 

|-
| style="text-align:left;"|1998
| The Mighty 
| Best Original Song
|
|-
| style="text-align:left;"|2000
| My Funny Friend and Me 
| Best Original Song 
|

MTV Movie Awards 

|-
| style="text-align:left;"|1993
| It's Probably Me 
| Best Song From a Movie 
|
|-
| style="text-align:left;"|1994
| All For Love  
| Best Song From a Movie 
|

MTV Video Music Awards

|-
| rowspan="7" align="center"| 
| rowspan="7"| "Every Breath You Take"
| Video of the Year
| 
|-
| Best Overall Performance in a Video
| 
|-
| Best Group Video
|
|-
| Best Direction
|
|-
|Viewer's Choice
|
|-
| Best Art Direction
|
|-
| Best Cinematography in a Video
| 
|-
| rowspan="2" align="center"| 
| rowspan="2"| "If You Love Somebody Set Them Free"
| Best Male Video
| 
|-
| Best Overall Performance in a Video
| 
|-
| rowspan="2" align="center"| 
| rowspan="2"| "We'll Be Together"
| Best Choreography in a Video
| 
|-
| Best Cinematography in a Video
| 
|-
| rowspan="3" align="center"| 
| rowspan="3"| "If I Ever Lose My Faith in You"
| Best Male Video
| 
|-
| Best Art Direction in a Video
| 
|-
| Best Cinematography in a Video
|

MOJO Awards 

|-
| style="text-align:left;"|2004
| Himself 
| Mondial Award 
|

Mercury Prize 

|-
| style="text-align:left;"|1993
| Ten Summoner's Tales 
| Album of the Year 
|

My VH1 Music Awards 

|-
| style="text-align:left;"|2000
| Himself 
| Legend in Action 
|

NME Awards 

|-
| style="text-align:left;"|1979
| Himself 
| Best Male Singer 
|

NRJ Music Awards 

|-
| style="text-align:left;"|2015
| Himself 
| NRJ Award of Honor 
|

Orville H. Gibson Guitar Awards 

|-
| style="text-align:left;"|2000
| Himself 
| Best Bassist (Male) 
|
|-
| style="text-align:left;"|2001
| Himself 
| Best Bassist (Male) 
|

Polar Music Prize 

|-
| style="text-align:left;"|2017
| Himself 
| Polar Music Prize  
|

Pollstar Concert Industry Awards

|-
| 2000
| Tour 
| Small Hall Tour of the Year 
| 
|-
| 2005
| Tour (w/Annie Lennox)
| Major Tour of the Year 
|

Primetime Emmy Awards

Q Awards 

|-
| style="text-align:left;"|1993
| Ten Summoner's Tales 
| Best Album 
|

Rock the Vote Patrick Lippert Awards 

|-
| style="text-align:left;"|2000
| Himself 
| Patrick Lippert Award  
|

Satellite Awards 

|-
| style="text-align:left;"|2001
| My Funny Friend and Me 
| Best Original Song 
|

Songwriters Hall of Fame 

|-
| style="text-align:left;"|2002
| Himself 
| Inducted 
|

Tony Awards 

|-
| style="text-align:left;"|2015
| The Last Ship  
| Best Original Score 
|

VH1/Vogue Fashion Awards 

|-
| style="text-align:left;"|2000
| Himself 
| Most Fashionable Artist (Male)  
|

World Soundtrack Awards 

|-
| style="text-align:left;"|2002
| Until 
| Best Original Song 
|
|-
| style="text-align:left;"|2004
| You Will Be My Ain True Love 
| Best Original Song 
|

References

Sting
Sting